Antonia Lloyd-Jones (born 1962) is a British translator of Polish literature based in London. She is best known as the long-time translator of Olga Tokarczuk's works in English, including Drive Your Plow Over the Bones of the Dead which was shortlisted for the International Booker Prize in 2019. The former co-chair of the Translators Association in the United Kingdom from 2015 to 2017, she is also a mentor for the Emerging Translator Mentorship Programme in the National Centre for Writing and has mentored several early-career translators from Polish into English.

Biography 
Antonia Lloyd-Jones graduated from Oxford after studying Russian and Ancient Greek. After first travelling to Wrocław in 1983 during the period of martial law to visit friends who had been involved in protests, Lloyd-Jones intended to report on the social unrest as a journalist and began learning Polish.  While working as the editor of the Polish-language magazine Brytania published by the Central Office of Information, she met author Paweł Huelle at an arts festival in Glasgow after the publication of his first novel in 1987, Weiser Dawidek. The English translation, Who Was David Weiser?, was published by Bloomsbury in 1991. Since 1991, she has published numerous works by Polish novelists, journalists, essayists, poets, and children's authors. She began translating from Polish full time in 2001.

Lloyd-Jones has frequently discussed the challenges of finding publishers willing to take the financial risk of publishing Polish and other "minor" languages compared to more mainstream languages, such as French or Spanish, and lauded the works of small, independent publishers, such as Open Letter Books, that take an interest in "commercially unviable" literature.

Translations

Fiction

Poetry

Nonfiction 

 
 
 
 
 
 
 
 
 
 
  (co-translated with Zosia Krasodomska-Jones)

Children's fiction 
  (co-translated with Zosia Krasodomska-Jones)

Awards

 Found in Translation Award 2009 for The Last Supper by Paweł Huelle. 
 Found in Translation Award 2013 for seven works published in 2012.
 ZAiKS prize for translation into English, 2017.
 Transatlantyk Prize for the best promoter of Polish literature abroad, 2018.
 Silver Medal for Merit to Culture – Gloria Artis awarded by the Polish Ministry of Culture for contribution to culture, 2019.

References 

1962 births
Living people
Polish–English translators
British translators
20th-century British translators
21st-century British translators
Literary translators
Alumni of the University of Oxford